The Diane-class submarines were a group of nine submarines built for the French Navy during the 1930s. Six boats were sunk during the Second World War and the others were sold for scrap in 1946.

Ships
SOURCES uboat.net FR Diane Accessed 27 April 2022uboat.net FR Antiope Accessed 27 April 2022uboat.net FR Amazone Accessed 27 April 2022uboat.net FR Oréade Accessed 27 April 2022uboat.net FR La Psyché Accessed 27 April 2022

Notes

Bibliography

External links
French Submarines: 1863 - Now
Sous-marins Français 1863 -  (French)

 
Submarine classes
 
Ship classes of the French Navy